Ann Henderson  (11 October 1921– 13 March 1976) was a Scottish sculptor born in Thurso, Caithness, Scotland. Henderson taught sculpture at the Edinburgh College of Art for almost twenty years and was elected a member of the Royal Scottish Academy in 1973.

Biography 
Ann Henderson was born into a farming family at Ormlie, near Thurso. While a pupil at the Miller Academy, her art teacher recognised and encouraged her creative flair and was influential in persuading Ann’s parents to allow her to study sculpture.

In 1940 Henderson became a student at the Sculpture School of the Edinburgh College of Art, graduating in 1945 (the only woman in her year). For achieving high results in her Diploma of Sculpture she was awarded a Post-graduate scholarship. This enabled her to embark on further studies in the Sculpture School and as a result, she was awarded a major travel scholarship that took her to Paris. There she studied under the French sculptor Marcel Gimond at the École des Beaux-Arts. In 1941 her family had moved to a farm at Culrain in Easter Ross and it was to this property that Henderson returned as a student during her college holidays.

Before embarking on her scholarship travels, Henderson worked for a year as a Junior Assistant Teacher in the Sculpture School, returning to this position after her travel year. She was later promoted to Lecturer and subsequently to Senior Lecturer. Henderson introduced new experimental teaching courses to the Sculpture School. Henderson’s sculptures would often begin life in her studio as clay maquettes. She embraced new materials and was one of the first sculptors in Scotland to use polyester resin and fiberglass in any significant way. Her sculptures ranged from the figurative to the abstract as the influences of realism gave way to that of cubism and abstraction. Picasso’s cubist approach and joy in combining materials are reflected in her large plaster and bark sculpture ‘Hen Wife’ constructed in the forest. 

Her later development towards a smooth uncomplicated form is illustrated in an untitled figure (see the image, right). She said of her work simply that she liked to reflect the life around her.

Henderson’s sculptures have been exhibited in many of the important galleries in the United Kingdom including the annual exhibitions of the Society of Scottish Artists, the Royal Scottish Academy, the Royal Academy, London, and in Paris.

Her academic successes included three RSA Annual Exhibition awards: The Keith Prize given for the best work by a student; the Ottilie Helen Wallace Prize for best work by a woman artist and the coveted Guthrie Award for the most outstanding work by a young Scottish artist. The Guthrie Award money enabled Ann to study in Greece for three months. Later she would become a member of the Scottish Arts Council’s ‘young artists’ awards panel.

In 1969 Henderson was instrumental in mounting an International Open Air Exhibition of Sculpture in Dunfermline, believed to be one of the first of its kind in Scotland. This was a venue she returned to in 1972 when she organised a second open-air exhibition. Henderson was also responsible for an imaginative scheme while convener for the RSA commemorative Exhibition In 1976. She died before the exhibition took place but her ideas were realised through her associates on the committee.

While Henderson’s studio in Edinburgh was central to her creative practice she also spent time at her Highland croft. There, she and her business partner would breed and show Highland ponies which won prizes at agricultural shows including the Royal Highland Show. While on the croft she worked on her sculptures in a makeshift studio space. Before her death, she completed the reconstruction of a superb studio but sadly illness was to rob her of the opportunity to use it. Ann died on 14 April 1976 in her 55th year.

Bill Scott her friend and colleague wrote of Ann after her death in the RSA Annual Report 1976: “We have lost a sculptor of maturity, energy, and influence, an artist whose reticent authority and breadth of vision were above question...”

Studies and Teaching Career 
 1940-1945    Diploma of Sculpture, Edinburgh College of Art
 1945-1946    Post-graduate Scholarship ‘Highly Commended’. Studied under the direction of Eric Schilsky, Head of School, Edinburgh College of Art
 1946-1947    Junior Assistant Teacher (part-time), School of Sculpture, Edinburgh College of Art
 1947-1948    Travel Scholarship – École des Beaux-Arts, Paris
 1948-1950    Junior Assistant Teacher (part-time), School of Sculpture, Edinburgh College of Art
 1950-1963    Junior Assistant Teacher (full-time), School of Sculpture, Edinburgh College of Art
 1963-1964    Lecturer, School of Sculpture, Edinburgh College of Art
 1964         Senior Lecturer, School of Sculpture, Edinburgh College of Art

Awards 
 1945	Post-Graduate Scholarship ‘(Diploma of Sculpture’ assessment)
 1946	Major Travel Scholarship (‘Highly Commended’ post-graduate assessment)
 1952  RSA Keith prize (best student work in RSA Annual Exhibition)
 1954  RSA Guthrie Award ‘Composition’ bronze  (best work by a Young Scottish artist in RSA Annual Exhibition)
 1962  Ottilie Helen Wallace prize (best work by a woman artist in RSA Annual Exhibition)

Exhibitions 
Henderson exhibited regularly with the SSA and the RSA and later with the Royal Academy of Arts in London.
 1954	Royal Scottish Academy Exhibition, Edinburgh
 1957  Arts Council Festival Exhibition,  Edinburgh
 1959	The 1957 Gallery, Edinburgh
 1964  Royal Scottish Academy Exhibition, Edinburgh
 1964 Four Scottish Artists,  The Arts Council Gallery, 11 Rothesay Terrace, Edinburgh 3
 1969	Open Air Exhibition of Sculpture, Pittencrieff Park, Dunfermline.
 1972  Open Air Exhibition of Sculpture, Pittencrieff Park, Dunfermline.
 1974	Eight Edinburgh Sculptors, Music Pavilion, Pittencrieff Park, Dunfermline, Scotland

Permanent Collection 
‘Venus and Chair’ (bronze) Scottish National Gallery, Edinburgh, Scotland

Memberships 
 Member of the Scottish Arts Council panel responsible for awards for young artists.
 1955 Professional Member, Society of Scottish Artists
 1968 Associate, Royal Scottish Academy
 1973 Member, Royal Scottish Academy

Public Commissions 
 1956 ‘Education’ (carved granite (abstract)), Thurso High School, Thurso, Caithness, Scotland. Henderson donated her time, the Caithness Education committee covered the cost of the granite stone. Architect Sir Basil Spence, Glover and Ferguson.
 1958 ‘Agriculture’ (coloured concrete relief) on gable of School of  Agriculture, University of Edinburgh, Liberton, Edinburgh, Scotland. Architect: Reiach and Cowan
 1962 ‘Sculpture Light Fitting’ (chromium and Steel Plate). British European Airways Corporation, Princes Street, Edinburgh, Scotland.  Architect Law and Dunbar-Nasmith
 1964 ‘Music’ (bronze) Music Pavilion, George Watson School, Edinburgh. Architect Michael Laird
 November 1971	‘Man with Sheep’ (carved stone) Market Square, Galashiels, Scotland. Mr. C Scott of Gala and the Scottish Arts Council
 1963 - 1964 ‘They knew him in the Breaking of Bread’ (carved stone) Refractory, Nunraw Monastery, Haddington, Scotland

References

Further reading 
 Glasgow Herald, 22 August 1959, p8
 The Scotsman, 14 August 1957, p4
 The Scotsman, 24 August 1959, p4
 Lack of Vitality at RSA show, Martin Baillie, Glasgow Herald, 22 April 1971
 Photograph, RSA members selecting work for summer exhibition, Glasgow Herald, 17 March 1972
 Royal Scottish Academy, Edward Gage, The Scotsman, 4 May 1976
 A Strong Sense of History, Edward Cage, The Scotsman, 26 November 1979

External links

1921 births
1976 deaths
Alumni of the Edinburgh College of Art
People from Thurso
Royal Scottish Academicians
Scottish women artists